Tarucus balcanicus nigra, the black-spotted Pierrot, is a small butterfly found in India that belongs to the lycaenids or blues family.

Formerly regarded as a distinct species, it is nowadays considered to be a well-marked eastern subspecies of the Balkan Pierrot (T. balkanicus).

See also
List of butterflies of India (Lycaenidae)

Further reading
 
  
 
 
 
 

Tarucus
Butterflies of Asia
Butterfly subspecies